Alastair King (born 1967) is a British composer and conductor, perhaps best known for his musical contributions to film and television. He frequently collaborates with composers Charlie Mole, Geoff Zanelli, Nicholas Hooper and Rupert Gregson-Williams by either conducting for them or acting as an orchestrator or both.

Biography
King studied music at Bath College of Higher Education, graduating in 1991. He then undertook postgraduate study at Birmingham University and the University of Kansas.

His work Hit the Ground (Running, Running, Running) was the only European entry in the final of the composing competition Masterprize 2001.

In addition to his concert works, King has composed music for various films, including Shrek, Chicken Run, and Harry Potter and the Half-Blood Prince and television programmes, including the FIFA World Cup 2002, The Last Detective, Second Nature and William and Mary.

King's most recent roles include conducting and orchestrating on Doctor Who for Murray Gold and Segun Akinola. He replaced Ben Foster after his departure in 2015 and took on the full role for Series 10. He left the show after the 2017 Christmas special Twice Upon a Time, then returned in 2021 for Series 13's The Vanquishers, the finale of the six-part Flux arc, as well as the final three specials of Jodie Whittaker's era as the Thirteenth Doctor in 2022.

Filmography

References

Composers.co.uk profile
Sibelius Music profile
Music now biography in PDF

External links
Chester-Novello bio

1967 births
20th-century classical composers
20th-century British conductors (music)
20th-century English composers
21st-century classical composers
21st-century British conductors (music)
21st-century English composers
Alumni of Bath Spa University
English classical composers
English conductors (music)
British male conductors (music)
English film score composers
English male film score composers
English male classical composers
Living people
20th-century British male musicians
21st-century British male musicians